Liaquat Ali is a Jatiya Party (Ershad) politician and the former Member of Parliament of Chittagong-8.

Career
Ali was elected to parliament from Chittagong-8 as a Jatiya Party candidate in 1988.

References

Jatiya Party politicians
Living people
4th Jatiya Sangsad members
Year of birth missing (living people)